Is Everybody Listening? is a live album by the English rock band Supertramp, released in 2001.

Overview 
Is Everybody Listening? is credited as being the 1976 recording of a concert that took place in Cleveland, Ohio. In fact, the actual concert took place on 9 March 1975 at London's Hammersmith Odeon during the Crime of the Century tour (as John Helliwell confirmed on his website).

Is Everybody Listening? features the entire Crime of the Century album and some tracks from the then still-to-be-recorded Crisis? What Crisis? album making up the middle third of the concert.

This recording was previously released as a bootleg prior to this release.

The mastering engineer Ray Staff has remastered this album as a part of the Crime of the Century Deluxe Edition 2CD-format reissue on 9 December 2014.

Track listing 
All songs written by Rick Davies and Roger Hodgson.
"School" – 6:17 – Lead vocals by Roger Hodgson and Rick Davies
"Bloody Well Right" – 6:50 – Lead vocals by Rick Davies
"Hide in Your Shell" – 6:52 – Lead vocals by Roger Hodgson
"Asylum" – 7:05 – Lead vocals by Rick Davies and Roger Hodgson
"Sister Moonshine" – 5:21 – Lead vocals by Roger Hodgson and Rick Davies
"Just a Normal Day" – 4:09 – Lead vocals by Rick Davies and Roger Hodgson
"Another Man's Woman" – 7:47 – Lead vocals by Rick Davies
"Lady" – 8:58 – Lead vocals by Roger Hodgson
"Dreamer" – 3:30 – Lead vocals by Roger Hodgson and Rick Davies
"Rudy" – 7:25 – Lead vocals by Rick Davies and Roger Hodgson
"If Everyone Was Listening" – 4:35 – Lead vocals by Roger Hodgson
"Crime of the Century" – 6:08 – Lead vocals by Rick Davies

Personnel 
Rick Davies – piano, keyboards, harmonica, vocals
Roger Hodgson – guitar, electric piano, keyboards, vocals
John Helliwell – saxophone, clarinet, keyboards, vocals
Dougie Thomson – bass, additional backing vocals
Bob Siebenberg – drums

Production 
Project coordinator: Carlton P. Sandercock
Design: Christian Thompson
Photography: Christian Thompson, Rick Walton
Illustrations: Christian Thompson
Liner notes: John Kirkman

2001 live albums
Supertramp live albums
Albums recorded at the Hammersmith Apollo